The 1969 East Carolina Pirates football team was an American football team that represented East Carolina University as a member of the Southern Conference during the 1969 NCAA University Division football season. In their eighth season under head coach Clarence Stasavich, the team compiled a 2–7 record.

Schedule

References

East Carolina Pirates
East Carolina Pirates football seasons
East Carolina